LLKS may refer to

 Kiryat Shmona Airport (ICAO code: LLKS)
 Union of Lithuanian Freedom Fighters (Lietuvos laisvės kovos sąjūdis)